Bruno Scipioni (29 July 1934 – 5 December 2019) was an Italian actor and voice actor.

Biography
Born in Rome, Scipioni graduated in accountancy and then, in 1958, he attended the Centro Sperimentale di Cinematografia.  He started his film career with Kapò (1959) and he was particularly active during the 1960s, usually being cast as a character actor.  He was also active on stage, in television series, in commercials and as voice actor.

He was the father of voice actor Carlo Scipioni.

Selected filmography

Terror of the Red Mask (1960) - Ribelle
Messalina (1960)
Letto a tre piazze (1960) - The Hotel Waiter
Silver Spoon Set (1960) - Minor role (uncredited)
Kapo (1960)
Il carro armato dell'8 settembre (1960)
Madri pericolose (1960) - Party Guest
I Teddy boys della canzone (1960) - Police radio Operator
Garibaldi (1961) - Lieutenant Adolfo Faconti
L'assassino (1961)
Ghosts of Rome (1961) - Otello l'idraulico
Un giorno da leoni (1961)
Queen of the Seas (1961)
Always on Sunday (1962) - Il garagista
Warriors Five (1962) - Angelino
Samson Against the Sheik (1962) - Luis
La bellezza di Ippolita (1962)
Le massaggiatrici (1962) - Hotel Doorman
The Rebel Gladiators (1962)
Sexy Toto (1963)
Perseo l'invincibile (1963)
Zorro and the Three Musketeers (1963)
The Magnificent Adventurer (1963) - Una Guardia
Mare matto (1963)
Tutto il bello dell'uomo (1963)
The Organizer (1963)
Hercules Against the Mongols (1963)
I 4 tassisti (1963)
I terribili 7 (1963) - Cronista
Heroes of the West (1964) - Verdugo
La ragazza di Bube (1964) - Mauro (uncredited)
Seduced and Abandoned (1964) - (uncredited)
The Avenger of Venice (1964)
Hercules Against the Barbarians (1964)
I marziani hanno 12 mani (1964)
Maciste in King Solomon's Mines (1964) - Kadar
I nuvoloni (1964)
Cuatro balazos (1964) - Jurado
Romeo and Juliet (1964) - Balthasar
Tre per una rapina (1964)
Red Desert (1964)
Time of Indifference (1964)
I gemelli del Texas (1964)
Hercules and the Treasure of the Incas (1964) - Darmon Henchman
Love and Marriage (1964) - Il secondo uomo (segment "L'ultima carta")
Revenge of The Gladiators (1964) - Guard
The Naked Hours (1964) - Marcello
Challenge of the Gladiator (1965)
Su e giù (1965)
The Possessed (1965)
Sandra (1965) - Minor role (uncredited)
James Tont operazione U.N.O. (1965) - Doorkeeper's Friend
For One Thousand Dollars Per Day (1966)
Europa canta (1966) - Nicky, the Italian
Ringo and His Golden Pistol (1966) - Townsman
El Greco (1966) - Officer
Amore all'italiana (1966) - Corrispondente
Io non protesto, io amo (1967) - Ghighi - Record Store Owner
The Handsome, the Ugly, and the Stupid (1967)
Marinai in coperta (1967) - Sergeant
Dramma della gelosia (1970) - Pizza maker
Bianco, rosso e... (1972) - Chiacchiera
Le mille e una notte... e un'altra ancora! (1973) - Ar Dashir
The Sensuous Sicilian (1973) - Vincenzo Torrisi
Commissariato di notturna (1974) - Brigadiere Talentini
La figliastra (1976) - Barone Francesco 'Cocò' Laganà
Ridendo e scherzando (1978) - Un agente
Dark Illness (1990) - (voice)
Cominciò tutto per caso (1993) - Padre di Stefania

References

External links

1934 births
2019 deaths
Italian male film actors
Italian male voice actors
Male actors from Rome
Centro Sperimentale di Cinematografia alumni
Italian male stage actors
Italian male television actors
20th-century Italian male actors